Andrew Tut Fo Ing (1919 or 1920 – March 6, 1999) was an American politician and the third lieutenant governor of Hawaii in the administration of Governor John A. Burns. Ing was a member of the Hawaii Democratic Party.

Early years
After graduating from Roosevelt High School and the University of Hawaii at Mānoa, Ing earned his master's in business administration from Harvard Business School. Ing served in World War II from 1943 to 1945 as an Army liaison supply officer and was recalled in 1951, rising to the rank of lieutenant colonel.

Lieutenant Governor
Ing served as state budget and finance director from 1962 to 1966. When Lieutenant Governor William S. Richardson resigned to become chief justice of the Hawaii Supreme Court, Ing was appointed and took office on April 13, 1966, until the term ended on December 2, 1966.

Later career
After serving as lieutenant governor, Ing returned to his post as state budget and finance director. In 1969, Ing stepped down to work for Hawaii Electric Light Co.

Ing died on March 6, 1999, at the age of 79 at Maui Memorial Hospital.

References 

Year of birth missing (living people)
1920s births
1999 deaths
University of Hawaiʻi at Mānoa alumni
Harvard Business School alumni
Hawaii Democrats
Lieutenant Governors of Hawaii